Regiae may refer to :

 Regiae (also Regiæ), an Ancient city and former bishopric in Roman Mauretania (modern Algeria), now a Latin Catholic episcopal titular see
 Regiae, a proposed clade within the tropical pitcher plant genus Nepenthes